Walter Polovchak (born 3 October 1967) is a Ukrainian-American man who, as a child, became the center of the legal case Polovchak v. Meese after he refused, at 12, to leave the United States to return to Ukraine, then part of the USSR, with his parents.

Background
The Polovchak family consisted of parents Michael and Anna and their three children, who came to the United States from Soviet Ukraine in January 1980 and settled in Chicago. Later that year, the parents decided to move back to the USSR, but the two elder children, Nataly, 17, and Walter, 12, disagreed. On July 13, 1980, both left their parents' Chicago home to stay with a cousin in the same city. The parents sought the assistance of the police to get their children back, but upon the advice of the US Immigration and Naturalization Service (INS) and of the US State Department, the police decided not to return the children to their parents but instead to start custody proceedings in an Illinois court.

Asylum application
On July 19, 1980, Walter, with the help of his lawyer, filed an application for asylum with the INS, on the grounds of potentially being disadvantaged and persecuted in the USSR for being a defector. The application was granted, and in October 1981, he was able to adjust his legal status to that of a lawful permanent resident.

Court case

The case became a Cold War cause célèbre after the INS allowed Polovchak to stay against his parents' will, even as they pursued legal means to retake custody of their son. While Walter and Nataly lived apart from their parents during the dispute, the sympathetic Reagan administration helped to drag out court proceedings until Walter turned 18 and was no longer a minor.

The case has similarities to that of Elián González.

Aftermath
Since becoming a US citizen in 1985, Walter visits the now-independent Ukraine every other year and has re-established relations with his parents. He now lives in the Chicago suburb of Des Plaines, is married, and has two sons.

See also
 Elian Gonzalez affair – a 1999 Cuban child asylum case

References

Sources
Shipp ER. Soviet boy to be a "free man" today. New York Times, October 3, 1985, Section A, Page 18, Column 1.

External links
CBS News story
Videofact

1967 births
Living people
20th-century Ukrainian people
People from Chicago
Soviet defectors to the United States